Sovetsky (masculine), Sovetskaya (feminine), Sovetskoye (neuter), or Sovetskiye (plural) is something named after the Soviet Union.

Places
Sovetsky District (disambiguation), several districts in the countries of the former Soviet Union
Sovetsky Okrug (disambiguation), various divisions in Russia
Sovetsky Urban Settlement (or Sovetskoye Urban Settlement), several municipal urban settlements in Russia
Sovetsky, Russia (Sovetskaya, Sovetskoye), several inhabited localities in Russia
Sovetsky, Baku (Sovetskaya), historical inhabited locality in Baku's Yasamal district
Sovietskyi (Sovetsky), an urban-type settlement in Crimea
Sovietske (Sovetskoye), an urban-type settlement in Crimea
Sovetskiy, Kyrgyzstan, an urban-type settlement in Kyrgyzstan
Sovetsky Airport, an airport in Khanty-Mansi Autonomous Okrug, Russia
Sovietsky Hotel, a hotel located in Moscow
Sovetskaya (Antarctic Research Station), the Soviet Antarctic research station
Sovetskaya (lake), a lake in the Antarctic, under the station
Sovetskaya Mountain, a mountain on Wrangel Island
Sovetskoye, Altai Krai, a rural locality (a selo) and the administrative center of Sovetsky District of Altai Krai
Sovetskoye, Jalal-Abad, a village in Jalal-Abad Region, Kyrgyzstan
Sovetskoye, Kemin, a village in Kemin District, Kyrgyzstan
Savieckaja Square, the Soviet name for the central square of Hrodna, Belarus

Other
Sovetskaya metro station, a metro station of the Samara Metro, Samara, Russia
Sovetskoye Shampanskoye, a generic brand of sparkling wine

See also
Soviet (disambiguation)
Soviet Union (disambiguation) including Sovetsky Soyuz
Sovetsk